WFXZ-CD (channel 24) is a Class A BizTV-affiliated television station licensed to Boston, Massachusetts, United States. The station is owned by the WGBH Educational Foundation. WFXZ-CD's studios are located in Woburn.

Under a channel sharing arrangement, WFXZ-CD shares transmitter facilities with PBS member station WGBH-TV (channel 2) on Cabot Street in Needham. Despite WFXZ-CD legally holding a low-power Class A license, it transmits using WGBH-TV's full-power spectrum. This ensures complete reception across the Boston television market.

History

The station's construction permit was originally granted on November 30, 1989 as W29BA, operating on channel 29, which would be licensed to nearby Lawrence. However, by the time finally it signed on the air with a home shopping service in early 2000, it had moved to channel 24, was licensed to Boston and adopted the W24CM call sign.

A few months later, channel 24 changed its call letters to WVXN-LP. In 2001, the station was upgraded to Class A status as WVXN-CA and dropped home shopping programming in favor of affiliating with MTV2.  The station changed its callsign to WFXZ-CA in 2003. In July 2006, the station became the Boston affiliate of the Azteca América network.

WFXZ flash-cut its signal to digital transmission in 2010. Longtime owner Randolph Weigner agreed to sell WFXZ to Prime Time Partners in December 2011. The station became a charter MundoFox affiliate when the network formally launched on August 13, 2012, with Azteca America programming moving to its second digital subchannel; it returned to primary status early on December 1, 2016 due to MundoMax ending operations (shortly after Fox International Channels dropped out of the joint venture in 2015). During its affiliations with MundoFox/MundoMax and Azteca América, WFXZ-CD was carried on Comcast Xfinity digital channels 721 and 981, and Verizon FiOS channel 20.

In the FCC's incentive auction, WFXZ-CD sold its spectrum for $63,949,770 and indicated that it would enter into a post-auction channel sharing agreement. On September 8, 2017, the station entered into a channel sharing agreement with WGBH-TV (channel 2); concurrently, Prime Time Partners agreed to donate the WFXZ license to the WGBH Educational Foundation.  WFXZ shut down its UHF digital channel 24 transmitter on December 3, 2017 and began channel-sharing on WGBH-TV's channel 19 transmitter; WGBH's acquisition of the station was completed on December 21, 2017, at which point the station dropped Azteca América for BizTV. Concurrently, the station's carriage on Comcast Xfinity and Verizon FiOS was discontinued.

Digital television

Digital channels

References

Television channels and stations established in 2000
Low-power television stations in the United States
FXZ-CD
WGBH Educational Foundation